Harem District is a district of the Idlib Governorate in northwestern Syria. The administrative centre is the city of Harem. At the 2004 census, it had a population of 175,482.  Name is identical with haram meaning forbidden in Islam.

Sub-districts
The district of Harem is divided into six sub-districts or nawāḥī (population as of 2004):
Harem Subdistrict (ناحية حارم): population 12,894.
Al-Dana Subdistrict (ناحية الدانا): population 60,058.
Salqin Subdistrict (ناحية سلقين): population 47,939.
Kafr Takharim Subdistrict (ناحية كفر تخاريم): population 14,772.
Qurqania Subdistrict (ناحية  قورقينا): population 12,552.
Armanaz Subdistrict (ناحية أرمناز): population 27,267.

References

 
Districts of Idlib Governorate